Kevin Christopher Minter (born December 3, 1990) is an American football linebacker who is a free agent. He was drafted by the Arizona Cardinals in the second round of the 2013 NFL Draft. He played college football at LSU, where he earned first-team all-Southeastern Conference honors.

Early years
Minter was born in Suwanee, Georgia, the son of Leonard Minter and Willie Mae Hollis.  Minter attended Berkmar High School in Lilburn, Georgia for his freshman and sophomore years before transferring to Peachtree Ridge High School in Suwanee for his junior and senior seasons. He was a starter for all four years of his high school career. In his junior year, he had 137 tackles. In his senior year, he had 113 tackles and was named to the Class 5A all-state first-team.

College career
Minter enrolled in Louisiana State University, and played for coach Les Miles's LSU Tigers football team from 2009 to 2012.  He redshirted the 2009 season. The following year, he had 15 tackles. In 2011, he had 61 tackles and one sack. He had five tackles and a sack in the BCS Championship Game.

In 2012, Minter had 130 tackles, which led the team and was the third-best total in the SEC. He also had 4.0 sacks. He had a career-best 20 tackles and two sacks against Florida, and his 17 solo tackles versus Florida was an LSU single-game record. In the Chick-fil-A Bowl, he set an LSU bowl game record with 19 tackles. Minter was a Butkus Award finalist, a first-team All-SEC selection, and the LSU team MVP. Sports Illustrated named him to their All-American first-team. He left LSU after the season to enter the 2013 NFL Draft. He ended his collegiate career with 206 tackles and 5.0 sacks.

In 2012, he graduated from LSU with a bachelor's degree in general studies.

Professional career

Arizona Cardinals

Minter was drafted by the Arizona Cardinals in the second round, with the 45th overall pick, of the 2013 NFL Draft. In his rookie season, Minter contributed as a special teams player as he only played two defensive snaps while making four tackles.

The following year, Minter appeared in all 16 games, starting four and totaling 44 tackles. The next two seasons, he started in all 32 games at linebacker, recording a combined 175 tackles and four sacks.

Cincinnati Bengals
On March 18, 2017, Minter signed a one-year contract with the Cincinnati Bengals. He played in nine games, starting seven, before suffering a hamstring injury in Week 14. He was placed on injured reserve on December 15, 2017.

New York Jets
On April 9, 2018, Minter signed with the New York Jets. He was released on August 31, 2018.

Tampa Bay Buccaneers
On October 23, 2018, Minter signed with the Tampa Bay Buccaneers, but was released eight days later. He was re-signed on November 13, 2018. He was placed on injured reserve on December 11, 2018.

On March 13, 2019, Minter re-signed with the Buccaneers.

On March 25, 2020, Minter re-signed with the Buccaneers. He was placed on the reserve/COVID-19 list by the team on January 11, 2021, and activated on January 20.

On March 20, 2021, Minter re-signed with the Buccaneers.

Personal life
He has been married since 2019 to Sydne Rie Minter, a Real Estate Agent in Atlanta. They have a son, Kevin Minter Jr and daughter, Santana Minter.

References

External links
LSU Tigers bio

1990 births
Living people
People from Suwanee, Georgia
Sportspeople from the Atlanta metropolitan area
Players of American football from Georgia (U.S. state)
American football linebackers
LSU Tigers football players
Arizona Cardinals players
Cincinnati Bengals players
New York Jets players
Tampa Bay Buccaneers players